The 1992–93 New Jersey Devils season was the 19th season for the National Hockey League franchise that was established on June 11, 1974, and 11th season since the franchise relocated from Colorado prior to the 1982–83 NHL season. The Devils finished fourth in the Patrick Division with a record of 40 wins, 37 losses and seven ties for 87 points. However, they lost the Patrick Division Semi-final to the Presidents' Trophy-winning Pittsburgh Penguins in five games.

The Devils were coached by Herb Brooks, who had led the U.S. men's ice hockey team to victory in the 1980 Winter Olympics in Lake Placid, New York. The team was captained by defenseman Scott Stevens.

In 1992–93 the Devils debuted a new color scheme – they kept the red and white, but replaced the green with black. The red, white and black color scheme is still in use today.

Regular season
The Devils tied the Pittsburgh Penguins for most short-handed goals allowed in the NHL, with 19.

Final standings

Schedule and results

Playoffs

Patrick Division Semifinals

(P4) New Jersey Devils vs. (P1) Pittsburgh Penguins 

The series opened at Civic Arena. Pittsburgh won Game 1, 6–3, and Game 2, 7–0. Games 3 and 4 were at New Jersey. Pittsburgh won Game 3, 4–3, and the Devils won Game 4, 4–1. Game 5 was played back in Pittsburgh, where the Penguins won 5–3 and won the series 4–1.

Player statistics

Regular season
Scoring

Goaltending

Playoffs
Scoring

Goaltending

Note: GP = Games played; G = Goals; A = Assists; Pts = Points; +/- = Plus/minus; PIM = Penalty minutes; PPG = Power-play goals; SHG = Short-handed goals; GWG = Game-winning goals
      MIN = Minutes played; W = Wins; L = Losses; T = Ties; GA = Goals against; GAA = Goals against average; SO = Shutouts; SA = Shots against; SV = Shots saved; SV% = Save percentage;

Awards and records

Awards

Transactions

Draft picks
The New Jersey Devils' picks at the 1992 NHL Entry Draft.

See also
1992–93 NHL season

Notes

References

New Jersey Devils seasons
New Jersey Devils
New Jersey Devils
New Jersey Devils
New Jersey Devils
20th century in East Rutherford, New Jersey
Meadowlands Sports Complex